Boamponsem
Nana Dokua
Nana Kwaku Boateng
Nana Kuntunkununku II
Nana Obiri Yeboa
Nana Ofori Atta II
Osei Yaw Akoto
Osei Kwame Panyin
Osei Bonsu
Nana Oti Akenten
Ndewura Jakpa
Ntim Gyakari
Togbe Osei III
Ofori Panyin I
Okomfo Anokye 
Osei Tutu Agyeman Prempeh II
Otumfuo Nana Osei Tutu I
Otumfuo Nana Osei Tutu II
Opoku Ware I
Yaa Naa Yakubu II
Yaa Asantewaa

References 

Ghanaian royalty
Rulers